Goongerah is a community on the Brodribb River, located in Gippsland, Australia, near Mount Ellery. The town's population is about sixty.

Goongerah Post Office opened on 21 November 1952 and closed in 1974. Goongerah had one of the smallest primary schools in Victoria, with about 11 students. It closed in 2019.

Goongerah is home to GECO (the Goongerah Environment Centre Office), which is dedicated to fighting for the protection of native forests in East Gippland from logging, such as Goolengook.

References

Towns in Victoria (Australia)
Shire of East Gippsland